Lona Minne Schreiber (born 1945) was an American politician.

Minne lived in Hibbing, Minnesota and her husband is William R. Schreiber who also served in the Minnesota Legislature. She went to the Hibbing High School and the Hibbing Junior College. Minne served as clerk of the Stuntz Township which was annexed to Hibbing, Minnesota. Minne served in the Minnesota House of Representatives from 1979 to 1988 and was a Democrat.

References

1945 births
Living people
People from Hibbing, Minnesota
Women state legislators in Minnesota
Democratic Party members of the Minnesota House of Representatives